Commodore Lord Robert Thomas Brudenell-Bruce (25 Jan 1845 – 15 Feb 1912) was a British Commodore of the Royal Navy.

He was born the fourth son of Ernest Brudenell-Bruce, 3rd Marquess of Ailesbury. He gained the rank of Commodore in 1900 and inherited Deene Park in Northamptonshire on the death of his father in 1886.

He married Emma Leigh in 1878 and had 4 sons and 3 daughters. Before inheriting Deene Park the family lived on Hayling Island, near Portsmouth.

He died on 15 February 1912 at the age of 67. His eldest son and heir James Ernest was killed in the First World War in 1917. His second son, George Lionel Thomas, reverted his name back to Brudenell by Royal Licence and inherited Deene Park from his brother James Ernest. His fourth son John Charles Brudenell-Bruce became a  Member of the Legislative Council (M.L.C.) of the British Virgin Islands.

The west window of St Mary's Church, Hayling Island was installed to his memory by his children.

References

 
 

1845 births
1912 deaths
Royal Navy officers
Younger sons of marquesses